USS Caroline (SP-1105) was a United States Navy patrol vessel in commission from 1917 to 1918.

Caroline was built as a private motorboat of the same name in 1912. On 17 May 1917, the U.S. Navy acquired her under a free lease from her owner, R. Brackenbury of San Diego, California, for use as a section patrol boat during World War I. She was commissioned as USS Caroline (SP-1105).

Assigned to the 12th Naval District, Caroline served on harbor patrol and guard ship duty at San Diego through the end of World War I.

The Navy returned Caroline to Brackenbury on 23 December 1918.

References

Department of the Navy Naval History and Heritage Command Online Library of Selected Images: Civilian Ships: Caroline (American Motor Boat, 1912). Served as USS Caroline (SP-1105) in 1917-1918
NavSource Online: Section Patrol Craft Photo Archive Caroline (SP 1105)

Patrol vessels of the United States Navy
World War I patrol vessels of the United States
1912 ships